Princesa is a 2001 film directed by Henrique Goldman that tells the story of a transsexual woman, Fernanda, who travels to Milan and works as a prostitute to finance her sex reassignment surgery. The film was inspired by a book of the same name written by Maurizio Janelli and Fernanda Farias de Albuquerque.

Cast 
 Ingrid de Souza as Fernanda
 Cesare Bocci as Gianni
 Lulu Pecorari as Karin
 Mauro Pirovano as Fabrizio
 Biba Lerhue as Charlo
 Sonia Morgan as Fofao
 Alessandra Acciai as Lidia
 Egidio Cardillo as Cliente

External links 
 
 
 
 

2001 films
2001 drama films
2000s Italian-language films
2000s Portuguese-language films
Films about trans women
2001 LGBT-related films
LGBT-related drama films
Italian LGBT-related films
Spanish LGBT-related films